Erling Kittelsen (born 10 April 1946) is a Norwegian poet, novelist, children's writer, playwright and translator. He made his literary debut in 1970 with the poetry collection Ville fugler. Kittelsen was part of the poetic action group "Stuntpoetene" during the 1980s, along with Jón Sveinbjørn Jónsson, Triztán Vindtorn, Arne Ruste, Thorvald Steen, Karin Moe, Torgeir Rebolledo Pedersen and others.

He was awarded the Mads Wiel Nygaard's Endowment in 1982, the Aschehoug Prize in 1990, and the Dobloug Prize in 2002.

Bibliography

 Wild birds (poems) 1970
 The tree arches (fable) 1973
 Between the rivers (7 stories) 1976
 Swing village (novel) 1977
 Long live the hull, rise from the junk (children book) 1979
 House in lockdown (biography) 1979
 Day and night at Le (poems) 1981
 Tiu (poetry cycle) 1982
 The wayward story about sollos, sealcats and a pocket of love in the sea (fable) 1983
 In this house (together with Paal-Helge Haugen, poems) 1984
 To tease a Guru, the story of a nameless seal) 1985
 Raka, the storyteller (fable) 1987
 Abiriel´s lion (play) 1988
 She (dialog with an Edda-poem, poetry cycle) 1989
 The spacedrifter (play) 1991
 Pit (fable) 1991
 Fable Vega (fable) 1992
 The house of the seven dolls (play) 1993
 Heaven, Lake (translation of He Dong together with the poet) 1994
 Oceans of moments (translation of Jamshed Masroor together with the poet) 1994
 Fleeing clouds (translating of Muniam Alfaker together with the poet) 1994
 In (48 poems) 1995
 Dainas (translation of Latvian folk-poems) 2006
 Otrap (A critical exposition or wondrous intervals during 46 positions of love, novel)  1998
 On the heaven (play) 2000
 The book of vision (translation of Muniam Alfaker together with Walid al-Kubaisi) 2001
 Vindkald (dialog with an Edda-poem) 2001
 The sail of Brage (dialog with a scaldic poem) 2003
 From vinehouse to mosque (translation together with Finn Thiesen, 5 Persien poets) 2003
 The rooster has crowed, the hero has done everything he had to do (poems, translated from Korean together with Vladimir Thikonov) 2004
 For Inanna (Enheduanna´s poem translated from Sumerian together with Jens Braarvig)
 The receiver (poems) 2005
 Diamond mountains (translation of poems of the dying together with Vladimir Thikonov) 2006
 All that remains (biography) 2007
 When the world whispers (translations of san-stories together with Roger Avenstrup) 2008
 Don´t tell it (play) 2009
 The poem runs like a town (poetry cycle) 2010
 Selected poems (bilingual, Norwegian/English) 2012
 I, Jako (novel) 2013
 The sleeper (play) 2014

References

1946 births
Living people
People from Vest-Agder
20th-century Norwegian poets
Norwegian male poets
20th-century Norwegian novelists
21st-century Norwegian novelists
Norwegian children's writers
Norwegian translators
Norwegian dramatists and playwrights
Dobloug Prize winners
Norwegian male novelists
Norwegian male dramatists and playwrights
21st-century Norwegian poets
20th-century Norwegian male writers
21st-century Norwegian male writers